The 1983 Montreal Expos season was the 15th season in franchise history. They finished 82-80, 8 games back of the Philadelphia Phillies in the NL East. At the end of the season, the Expos had managed the best cumulative winning percentage in the National League from 1979 to 1983.

Offseason 
 November 3, 1982: Bobby Ramos was purchased by the Expos from the New York Yankees.
 December 23, 1982: Woodie Fryman was signed as a free agent with the Expos.
 February 7, 1983: Jerry Manuel was traded by the Expos to the Chicago Cubs for Butch Benton.
 March 31, 1983: Ken Phelps was purchased from the Expos by the Seattle Mariners.

Spring training
The Expos held spring training at West Palm Beach Municipal Stadium in West Palm Beach, Florida – a facility they shared with the Atlanta Braves. It was their seventh season at the stadium; they had conducted spring training there from 1969 to 1972 and since 1981.

Regular season 
 April 17, 1983: Andre Dawson became Nolan Ryan's 3500th strikeout.
 April 27, 1983: Nolan Ryan of the Astros struck out Brad Mills to break Walter Johnson's all time mark for strikeouts in a career. Mills was the 3,509th strikeout of Ryan's career.

Season standings

Record vs. opponents

Opening Day lineup

Notable transactions 
 May 4, 1983: Chris Welsh was purchased by the Expos from the San Diego Padres.
 June 6, 1983: Cliff Young was drafted by the Expos in the 5th round of the 1983 Major League Baseball draft.
 June 18, 1983: Sergio Valdez was signed as an amateur free agent by the Expos.
 August 17, 1983: Don Carter (minors) and $300,000 were traded by the Expos to the Cleveland Indians for Manny Trillo.
 September 27, 1983: Greg Harris was selected off waivers by the Expos from the Cincinnati Reds.

Roster

Player stats

Batting

Starters by position 
Note: Pos = Position; G = Games played; AB = At bats; H = Hits; Avg. = Batting average; HR = Home runs; RBI = Runs batted in

Other batters 
Note: G = Games played; AB = At bats; H = Hits; Avg. = Batting average; HR = Home runs; RBI = Runs batted in

Pitching

Starting pitchers 
Note: G = Games pitched; IP = Innings pitched; W = Wins; L = Losses; ERA = Earned run average; SO = Strikeouts

Other pitchers 
Note: G = Games pitched; IP = Innings pitched; W = Wins; L = Losses; ERA = Earned run average; SO = Strikeouts

Relief pitchers 
Note: G = Games pitched; W = Wins; L = Losses; SV = Saves; ERA = Earned run average; SO = Strikeouts

Awards and honors 
Andre Dawson, National League Gold Glove
Tim Raines, National League Stolen Base Leader, 90
1983 Major League Baseball All-Star Game

Farm system 

LEAGUE CHAMPIONS: Gastonia

Notes

References

External links 
 1983 Montreal Expos at Baseball Reference
 1983 Montreal Expos at Baseball Almanac

Montreal Expos seasons
1983 Major League Baseball season
1980s in Montreal
1983 in Quebec